Epimestrol (brand names Alene, Stimovul; former developmental code name ORG-817), also known as 3-methoxy-17-epiestriol, is a synthetic, steroidal estrogen and an estrogen ether and prodrug of 17-epiestriol. It has been used as a component of ovulation induction in combination with gonadotropin-releasing hormone.

See also
 List of estrogens

References

Estranes
Ethers
Synthetic estrogens
Triols